Friedrich Richard Reinitzer (25 February 1857 in Prague – 16 February 1927 in Graz) was an Austrian botanist and chemist. In late 1880s, experimenting with cholesteryl benzoate,  he discovered properties of liquid crystals (named later by Otto Lehmann).

Reinitzer was born into a German Bohemian family in Prague. He studied chemistry at the German technical university in Prague; in 1883 he was habilitated there as a private docent. From 1888-1901 he was a professor at Karl-Ferdinands-Universität, then professor at technical university in Graz. During 1909 - 1910 he served as the rector of the university.

While at Karl-Ferdinands-Universität in 1888 he discovered a strange behaviour of what would later be called liquid crystals. For the explanation of their behaviour he collaborated with the physicist Otto Lehmann from Aachen. The discovery received plenty of attention at the time but no practical uses were apparent and the interest dropped soon.

Selected works 

 F. Reinitzer (1888) "Beiträge zur Kenntnis des Cholesterins", Monatshefte für Chemie 9:421–41.
 F. Reinitzer (1891) "Der Gerbstoffbegriff und seine Beziehung zur Pflanzenchemie", Lotos 39.

References

 David Dunmur & Tim Sluckin (2011) Soap, Science, and Flat-screen TVs: a history of liquid crystals, pp 17–20, Oxford University Press  .

19th-century Austrian botanists
Austrian chemists
German Bohemian people
Scientists from Prague
1857 births
1927 deaths
Czech Technical University in Prague alumni
Academic staff of the Graz University of Technology
Academic staff of Charles University
20th-century Austrian botanists